The Dothan Phillies (also known as the Cardinals, Rebels, Browns and Boll Weevils) were a Minor League Baseball team that represented the city of Dothan, Alabama. They played in the Alabama–Florida League, Alabama State League and Georgia–Florida League from 1936 to 1942 and 1946–1962. A previous team played in Dothan as a member of the Dixie League from 1915 to 1917.

The ballpark

Dothan teams played at Baker Field, City Park, Stadium Park, Jill Alexander Miracle Field and the Wiregrass Memorial Stadium.

Notable alumni

 Phil Gagliano (1960)
 Mike Marshall (1961) 2 x MLB All-Star; 1974 NL Cy Young Award
 Lance Richbourg (1917)
 Zack Taylor (1917)

References

External links
 Baseball Reference

Baseball teams established in 1915
Defunct minor league baseball teams
Professional baseball teams in Alabama
Defunct Alabama State League teams
Defunct Alabama-Florida League teams
Defunct Georgia-Florida League teams
Defunct Dixie League teams
Defunct Florida-Alabama-Georgia League teams
Baseball teams disestablished in 1962
Philadelphia Phillies minor league affiliates
St. Louis Cardinals minor league affiliates
St. Louis Browns minor league affiliates
1915 establishments in Alabama
1962 disestablishments in Alabama
Defunct baseball teams in Georgia